The slender mudskipper (Periophthalmus gracilis) is a species of mudskippers native to marine and brackish waters of the eastern Indian Ocean and the western Pacific Ocean where it is an inhabitant of the intertidal zone, capable of spending time out of water.  This species can reach a length of  SL.

References

External links 
 Fishes of Australia : Periophthalmus gracilis

slender mudskipper
Marine fish of Northern Australia
slender mudskipper